John Keogh (1740 – 13 November 1817) was an Irish merchant and political activist. He was a leading campaigner for Catholic Emancipation and reform of the Irish Parliament, active in Dublin on the Catholic Committee and, with some reservation, in the Society of United Irishmen.

Background 
Keogh was of an obscure family. He was born in Dublin and made his considerable fortune in land speculation, brewing, and silk trading.  He owned land in Dublin, County Sligo, County Roscommon, and County Leitrim, and by the 1790s he had an income of around £6,000 per year.

Political activity 
He became involved in the political struggle for Roman Catholic rights in the 1780s, when he was a member of the Catholic Committee from 1781.  In 1784, Keogh joined in a plan for Ulster and Dublin radical elements to combine to push for Catholic franchise, and by 1790 Keogh was leading the Catholic Committee.  He was part of a delegation that was denied a hearing by the Lord Lieutenant, and so they went to England to make their case for the repeal of the penal laws and extension of the vote to Catholics.  They met with government ministers personally, and they received promises; however, Lord Kenmare quashed all progress.

On the selection of the Protestant radical lawyer Theobald Wolfe Tone as Secretary to the Committee, he and Keogh became great friends, frequently travelling together around Ireland. Tone's nickname for Keogh was 'Gog'.

In December 1792, Keogh led the Catholic Convention in Dublin. The elections to the convention, "conducted in a blaze of publicity", spread "an expectation of dramatic change to Catholics at every level", and was a spur to the growth among the Catholic peasantry, petty shopkeepers and artisans of militant Defenderism The Viceroy, Lord Westmorland, called on London for additional troops. The Castle saw the hand of the United Irishmen represented, not least, by Keogh who had followed Tone into the Dublin Society of United Irishmen. Of the 248 delegates elected to the Catholic Convention, 48 were members of the Society.

The Catholic hierarchy was also alarmed, prompting Keogh to complain of the bishops as "old men used to bend power; mistaking all attempts at liberty as in some way connected with the murders in France". In opening the Convention (the "Back Lane Parliament"), to great applause, he had two prelates seated on either side of the chairmen. But the petition, as finally approved and signed by the delegates, was presented to the bishops as a fait accompli, with no implication that their sanction was sought or obtained.

In January 1793, Keogh led a delegation (which included Tone) that carried the petition, which called for full emancipation, to London. The government, eager to secure a measure of Catholic loyalty in advance of the war with the new French Republic, accorded them an audience with the King, and in April helped force a Catholic Relief Act through the Dublin Parliament. The Act relieved Catholics of most of their remaining Penal Law disabilities, lifting the bar to legal appointments and to army commissions, and admitting them on the same limited and idiosyncratic terms as Protestants to the parliamentary franchise. The necessary oaths, however, continued to bar them from Parliament itself. In return, Keogh promised that Catholics would not press for further separation from England and that their Committee would disband--concessions for which Keogh was sharply criticised. In 1795, Keogh briefly reconvened the Committee in response to the declaration of the new Lord Lieutenant, Earl Fitzwilliam in favour full emancipation. When Fitzwilliam was recalled after just 100 days, Keogh led another delegation to London where it received scant regard.

Keogh's authority and influence in the Catholic movement in Ireland decreased as newer leaders emerged, though he remained (at least formally) on the Dublin committee of the United Irishmen into 1798.  Although he was frequently arrested and searched, Keogh was a moderate radical, and he used his wealth to aid his co-religionists' cause without crossing the line to overt illegality. He was on the non-violent wing of the United Irishmen, along with Thomas Addis Emmet. Days before the outbreak of the 1798 Rebellion, in despair at the likely result, Keogh printed a pamphlet warning his followers in Dublin that it could not succeed.

Some republicans, such as Walter Cox (who acted as a body guard to Lord Edward Fitzgerald) were sceptical of Keogh's motives. Cox suggested that Keogh might have colluded with the government to frustrate the preparations for an insurrection. The acknowledged government informer Samuel Turner (himself a Convention delegate from Newry) suggests, however, that Keogh would have been an unlikely source of information for Dublin Castle. Turner reported that while Keogh was formally counted among 22 members of the "National Committee" of the United Irishmen meeting in Dublin in the summer of 1797, like his fellow Catholic Committee veterans Thomas Broughall and Richard McCormick, Keogh "did not attend".

Death and burial 
He died in Dublin in 1817 and was buried in St. Kevin's Churchyard, where his grave can be seen.

References

External links
 Finegan, Francis, SJ. "Was John Keogh an Informer?" Studies: An Irish Quarterly Review Vol. 39, No. 153 (Mar., 1950), pp. 75-86. Irish Province of the Society of Jesus

1740 births
1817 deaths
18th-century Irish people
19th-century Irish people
Irish Roman Catholics
People from Harold's Cross
United Irishmen